Geoffrey C. Kabat is an American epidemiologist, cancer researcher, and author. He has been on the faculty of the Albert Einstein College of Medicine and State University of New York, Stony Brook. He is mainly known for the discredited BMJ study funded by the tobacco industry, that failed to find an association between secondhand smoke and health problems. He has consistently disputed the health risks of second-hand smoke by casting doubt on the scientific consensus that secondhand smoke causes lung cancer, which is estimated to cause about 21400 deaths per year worldwide.

Scientific work 
Over a forty-year career, Kabat has studied a wide range of lifestyle, clinical, and environmental exposures in relation to cancer and other diseases, and mortality. Major topics of interest include: smoking, alcohol consumption, diet and nutrition, endogenous and exogenous hormones, obesity and height, the metabolic syndrome, physical activity, electromagnetic fields, and sleep.

In 2003, Kabat, who then worked at the State University of New York, Stony Brook, co-authored a study with James Enstrom in BMJ examining the association between passive smoking and tobacco-related mortality. The study concluded that its results "do not support a causal relation between environmental tobacco smoke and tobacco related mortality." The study was funded and heavily publicized by the tobacco industry. The paper was heavily criticized by the scientific community. The American Cancer Society(ACS) whose database Enstrom and Kabat used to compile their data, criticized the paper as "neither reliable nor independent", stating that scientists at the ACS had repeatedly pointed out serious flaws in Enstrom and Kabat's methodology prior to publication. Notably, the study had failed to identify a comparison group of "unexposed" persons. In a US racketeering lawsuit against tobacco companies, the Enstrom and Kabat paper was cited by the US District Court as "a prime example of how nine tobacco companies engaged in criminal racketeering and fraud to hide the dangers of tobacco smoke." The Court found that the study had been funded and managed by the Center for Indoor Air Research, a tobacco industry front group tasked with "offsetting" damaging studies on passive smoking, as well as by Philip Morris who stated that Enstrom's work was "clearly litigation-oriented." On May 22, 2009, a three-judge panel of the U.S. Court of Appeals for the District of Columbia Circuit unanimously upheld the lower court's 2006 ruling.

Books 
Kabat is the author of the book Hyping Health Risks, published in 2008 by Columbia University Press. The book examines several alleged environmental health risks, such as the proposed link between artificial chemicals and cancer, and concludes that these risks have been distorted. A 2017 Skeptical Inquirer review says that "Kabat ... helps readers understand relative versus absolute risk, medical research, [and] how pseudoscientific and questionable claims get [mis]reported by news media and activists...."

David A. Savitz reviewed the book and wrote "For the most part, the story of truth and misrepresentation of evidence on health risks [in the book] was engaging". It was also reviewed in the New England Journal of Medicine, where Barbara Gastel wrote that "Kabat is at his best in the chapters in which he presents the case studies," but she criticized the book's first chapter, entitled "Introduction: Toward a Sociology of Health Hazards in Daily Life". Neil Pearce wrote in the International Journal of Epidemiology that he "became more frustrated and less impressed as [he] worked [his] way through the book" and criticized the book for its "lack of balance".

Terence Hines wrote that Kabat "more than accomplishes" his goals of discovering how it is that extraordinary progress is made solving some problems but little is made solving others and why instances of progress get little attention while scientifically questionable issues get more attention. Hines said of the chapter reviewing the question of whether cell phones cause cancer, it "alone is worth the price of the book."

Kabat wrote another book building on the themes in Hyping Health Risks that was published in 2016.

References

External links 

Cancer epidemiologists
Living people
Albert Einstein College of Medicine faculty
American epidemiologists
Year of birth missing (living people)